The Wari Empire or Huari Empire was a political formation that emerged around 600 AD (CE) in Peru's Ayacucho Basin and grew to cover much of coastal and highland Peru. The empire lasted for about 500 years, until 1100 CE. It existed during the same era as the Tiwanaku culture, and at one time, was thought to have been derived from it. In 2008, archeologists found a precolumbian city, the Northern Wari ruins (also called Cerro Pátapo) near modern Chiclayo. The find was the first extensive settlement related to the Wari culture discovered that far north.

Debate on "empire" label
Some scholars in the field debate whether the Wari communities can be deemed an "empire". For instance, the archaeologist Ruth Shady has suggested the society could better be considered a loose economic network of Wari centres.

Scholars who contend the society did constitute an empire include William Isbell, Katherine Schreiber and Luis Lumbreras. They note its construction of an extensive network of roadways linking provincial cities, as well as the construction of complex, characteristic architecture in its major centres, some of which were quite extensive. Leaders had to plan projects and organize large amounts of labor to accomplish such projects.

The discovery in early 2013 of an undisturbed, imperial royal tomb, El Castillo de Huarmey, provides evidence of the material wealth and political power exercised by the Wari for centuries. The discovery of three royal women's bodies and their burial wealth plus the accompanying 60 bodies demonstrates a culture with the material wealth, political power, and administrative apparatus to provide extended veneration of the royal dead.

Political relations
The Wari Empire was a second-generation state of the Andean region; both it and Tiwanaku had been preceded by the first-generation Moche state. When expanding to engulf new polities, the Wari Empire practiced a policy of allowing the local leaders of the newly acquired territory to retain control of their area if they agreed to join the Wari empire and obey the Wari. The Wari required mit'a labor (non-reciprocal public labor for the state) of its subjects as a form of tribute. Mit'a laborers were involved in the construction of buildings at the Wari capital and in the provinces.

The political relationship between the Wari and Tiwanaku has been compared by archaeologist Joyce Marcus to that of the United States and the Soviet Union during the Cold War: the two empires did not go to war with one another for fear of mutual destruction. The two empires met at Moquegua, where the Wari and Tiwanaku populations co-existed without conflicts.

Administration
While the Wari likely had significant organizational and administrative power, it remains unclear what the origins of its political and artistic forms were. Emerging evidence suggests that rather than being the result of Tiwanaku traits diffusing north, the Wari and Tiwanaku ideological formations may be traceable to previous developments at Pukara, an Early Intermediate Period culture to the north of Lake Titicaca. The polity seems to have survived until ca. AD 1100, when it collapsed, likely as a result of both environmental change and internal socio-political stresses.

See also
Wari culture
Tiwanaku empire

References

Further reading

 Wendell C. Bennett, Excavations at Wari, Ayacucho, Peru (1953).
 Gordon F. McEwan, The Middle Horizon in the Valley of Cuzco, Peru: The Impact of the Wari Occupation of the Lucre Basin (1987).
 William H. Isbell and Gordon F. McEwan, eds., Huari Administrative Structure: Prehistoric Monumental Architecture and State Government (1991).
 Katharina J. Schreiber, Wari Imperialism in Middle Horizon Peru (1992).
 Justin Jennings and Nathan Craig (2001). Politywide Analysis and Imperial Political Economy: The Relationship between Valley Political Complexity and Administrative Centers in the Wari Empire of the Central Andes. Journal of Anthropological Archaeology.

Andean civilizations
Former monarchies of South America
Wari culture
Former empires in the Americas
Former countries
Former countries in South America